Fabio González Estupiñán (born 12 February 1997) is a Spanish professional footballer who plays for UD Las Palmas as a central midfielder.

Club career
Born in Ingenio, Las Palmas, Canary Islands, Fabio was an UD Las Palmas youth graduate. He made his senior debut with the reserves on 10 September 2016, starting in a 1–1 Tercera División away draw against UD Ibarra.

Fabio scored his first senior goal on 7 January 2017, netting the game's only in an away success over CD Buzanada. He made his first team – and La Liga – debut on 26 August, starting in a 1–5 home loss against Atlético Madrid.

On 17 June 2019, Fabio was definitely promoted to the main squad, now in Segunda División.

References

External links

1997 births
Living people
People from Gran Canaria
Sportspeople from the Province of Las Palmas
Spanish footballers
Footballers from the Canary Islands
Association football midfielders
La Liga players
Segunda División players
Segunda División B players
Tercera División players
UD Las Palmas Atlético players
UD Las Palmas players